La mujer de todos is a 1946 Mexican drama film directed by Julio Bracho and starring María Félix, Armando Calvo and Gloria Lynch. It is an adaptation of the 1848 novel The Lady of the Camelias by Alexandre Dumas with the setting moved to Mexico at the beginning of the twentieth century.

The film's sets were designed by the art director Jesús Bracho.

Main cast
 María Félix as María Romano 
 Armando Calvo as Capitán Jorge Serralde 
 Gloria Lynch as Señora Cañedo 
 Alberto Galán as Coronel Juan Antonio Cañedo 
 Patricia Morán as Angélica 
 Arturo Soto Rangel as General 
 Juan Calvo as Conde 
 Ernesto Alonso as Carlos 
 Alberto Pomo as César 
 Maruja Grifell as Portera

References

Bibliography 
 Daniel Balderston, Mike Gonzalez & Ana M. Lopez. Encyclopedia of Contemporary Latin American and Caribbean Cultures. Routledge, 2002.

External links 
 
 La mujer de todos ad Variety Distribution

1946 films
1940s Spanish-language films
Films directed by Julio Bracho
Films set in the 1900s
Mexican historical drama films
1940s historical drama films
Films based on French novels
Mexican black-and-white films
1946 drama films
1940s Mexican films